The 2021 Nashville SC season was the club's second season as a member of Major League Soccer. This was the club's last season in the Eastern Conference after being added to the Conference in 2020 after the MLS is Back Tournament as the club returns to the Western Conference the following season in 2022 due to the addition of Charlotte FC.

Club

Current roster

Roster transactions

In

Out

SuperDraft picks

Non-competitive

Preseason

Major League Soccer season

Eastern Conference

Overall

Results summary

Matches

MLS Cup Playoffs

References

Nashville SC seasons
Nashville SC
Nashville SC
Nashville SC